The Parish of Our Lady of the Abandoned, also known as the Santa Ana Church and newly declared as the National Shrine of Our Lady of the Abandoned (Spanish: Parroquia de Nuestra Señora de los Desamparados), is a Spanish colonial period church located in the district of Santa Ana in Manila, Philippines. The parish was established by the Franciscan missionaries in 1578 under the patronage of Saint Anne. The present stone church was constructed by Father Vicente Inglés, OFM from 1720 to 1725 and was dedicated to its present patron, the Our Lady of the Abandoned. The revered image of its patron was made in Valencia, Spain in 1713 and arrived in the Philippines in 1717.

The church houses two National Cultural Treasures declared by the National Museum of the Philippines: the Santa Ana Site Museum located in the convent patio and the Camarín de la Virgen (or the Dressing Room of the Virgin).

The elevation to National Shrine was declared last January 25, 2020 during the 120th Plenary Assembly of the Catholic Bishops Conference of the Philippines. The conferment of the title to the parish church will be on June 20, 2020 (tentatively).

History 
The town of Santa Ana was first established by the Spanish Franciscan missionaries in 1578, in a settlement beside a creek connecting to the Pasig River, which the local inhabitants referred to as Sapà. Its first church, dedicated to their titular patroness Saint Anne, was made of nipa and bamboo until a decree from the Colonial Government in 1599 permitted the religious order to build the church in stone. However, the construction came only around 1720 upon the direction of then parish priest of Santa Ana Fr. Vicente Inglés, OFM wherein a new site was chosen, which is the current location of the structure. Dedicated to Our Lady of the Abandoned, the building of the stone church began on September 12, 1720, with the laying of the cornerstone by Governor General and Archbishop of Manila Francisco de la Cuesta, OSA. The construction took five years to finish, with the total cost of ₱ 33,000 including the donation of the Governor General amounting to four thousand pesos.

In the early 1700s, Fr. Inglés went to Valencia, Spain. The friar had been very enamored of a famous image of Our Lady that had become a popular spiritual attraction in Valencia. The image was known as the Our Lady of the Abandoned. While Fr. Inglés was in Valencia in 1713, he decided to have a copy of this image for Santa Ana Parish, which was in the process of being constructed near Manila. After reverently touching the copy to the original image, the friar brought the new replica with him back to the Philippines in 1717. The image has been venerated in Santa Ana since then. In time, the parish became known as Our Lady of the Abandoned Parish, as it is today, though St. Anne still is honored in the church with a statue of her with the Child Mary in a niche directly above the image of Our Lady of the Abandoned. Governor-General Francisco de la Cuesta, offered his bastón de mando to the image, and proclaimed her Gobernadora de la Ciudad de Manila ("Governor of the City of Manila").

Santa Ana Church also served as barracks for wounded American soldiers during the Philippine–American War in 1899. The church complex was not destroyed by any bombs during the Battle of Manila in 1945.

Architecture 
The church structure follows the Baroque architectural style, utilizing adobe blocks in its wall surface finish to give an impression of massiveness. Its floor plan formed the shape of a Latin cross oriented in north–south direction, with the main entrance facing north. The church facade is divided into three levels by heavily molded string courses. The topmost level or the pediment is adorned with Vitruvian-scroll design on its raking cornice, and a central niche flanked with octagonal windows. The second level is composed of semicircular arched windows covered with stained glass. The lowermost level is the main entrance flanked with two niches containing the statues of St. Anne and St. Joachim, the parents of the Virgin Mary. The ornamentation is mostly found in the frames of lateral niches and the moldings in the cornices and the apertures. Attached to the right side of the structure next to the church facade is the four-floored octagonal bell tower, also made of adobe blocks and were embellished by heavy string courses and other ornamentation.

Notable features and components

Baptistery 
The baptistery or bautisterio is located at the base of the bell tower on the right side of the vestibule or entrance hall. Inside the small room contains the marble baptismal font and a Neoclassical retablo featuring the painting of the Baptism of Christ, framed by two Corinthian columns on each side. Conservation efforts on the Santa Ana church revealed that two paintings have actually adorned the retablo of the baptistery. The first painting one was done on wood, which depicted Saint John the Baptist pouring water on Jesus Christ, the Holy Spirit (symbolized by the dove) together with cherubs above them, and two angels holding a red cloak to cover Jesus. The wooden painting was later covered with the painting on metal, which most likely dated around 1938. The second painting has much simpler depiction, composing of only St. John the Baptist, Jesus Christ and the Holy Spirit above them.

Retablo 

The main altarpiece or the retablo is in churrigueresque style, characterized by heavy ornamentation, which is further highlighted by gold leaf on its details. It has thirteen niches, framed with solomonic and churrigueresque columns. The tabernacle or sagrario occupied the central niche at the lower level and is flanked by Franciscan Saints, namely Saint Bonaventure , Saint Peter of Alcantara, Saint Bernardino of Siena  and Saint Clare. The central niche of the second or main level is occupied by Our Lady of the Abandoned at the center, which is flanked by the images of Saint Dominic and Saint Francis of Assisi, founders of Catholic religious orders, and Biblical figures Saint John the Baptist and Saint John the Evangelist. The upper level niches contained the images of Saint Anne (the titular patron of Santa Ana district) at the center with Saint Peter and Saint Paul on its sides. At the top the retablo is the image of Saint Michael the Archangel, which is flanked by medallions containing the painted images of Saint Didacus  and Saint Paschal Baylon.

Dome interior 
The interior of the dome located above the crossing has two layers of balconies. Sixteen paintings depicting Jesus, the Twelve Apostles (with Saint Matthias replacing Judas Iscariot), the Four Evangelists; Saint Mark and Saint Luke, and Saint John decorate the first level balcony.

Camarín de la Virgen 
The Camarín de la Virgen (Dressing Room of the Virgin) is a small chapel located behind the niche of Our Lady of the Abandoned on the second tier of the retablo  It was built around the same period as the church (c. 1720–1725) and has retained most of its original features. One can view the nave of the church from the octagonal vaulted niche (hornacina) where the image stands. Its high-arched opening is crowned with a large, silver corona imperial (imperial crown). Below the hornacina is a semicircular gilded platform, which is said to be a part of the galleon that brought the image from Valencia all the way to Manila, the Santo Cristo de Burgos. Wooden steps flank the platform, and are used by devotees to climb and venerate the image. At present, only the Virgin's long cape can be touched or kissed.

Of note in this structure are the paintings on the ceiling and on the entrance, which are believed to be as old as the Camarín and the church itself. These paintings belonged to the short-lived Estampita Age of Filipino-Spanish art. The entrance paintings depict life-size images of the archangels Saint Michael and Saint Gabriel guarding the door, also painted with a heavenly scene surrounding the Auspice Maria, a monogram of the letters "A" and "M" representing the term "Under the guidance of Mary" and has the popular meanings of Ave Maria as well as the Holy Name of Mary. The ceiling paintings show Heaven in the center surrounded by eleven segments, with scenes from the lives of Mary and Jesus, from Mary's Betrothal to Saint Joseph to the Baptism of Christ. The central panel shows the Holy Trinity and the kneeling Virgin Mary, with cherubim and angels on both sides.

Due to the considerably good preservation of the structure as well as the irreplaceable value of its paintings, which were considered the oldest datable of its kind, the Camarín de la Virgen was declared a National Cultural Treasure in November 2008 by the National Museum of the Philippines.

Pozo de la Virgen 

Located behind the Santa Ana Church is the Capillita de la Virgen del Pozo (Small Chapel of the Virgin of the Well). Better known as the Pozo de la Virgen (Well of the Virgin), it housed a holy well of springwater believed to contain healing properties. The exact date of its construction is unknown, although it was generally assumed to have been built around the 18th century, around the same period as the church. The Pozo de la Virgen also enshrines an 18th-century wood and ivory relieve image of Our Lady of the Abandoned, placed in a low niche in a position suggesting her guarding the holy well. A wooden trapdoor, which occupies most of the floorspace, opens to reveal the passage to the well. There are ten stone steps that lead to the actual water level, which was contained within a small stone-and-concrete arched chamber.

During the typhoid epidemic of 1920, the well was closed due to sanitary concerns. During the 1977–85 renovations, it was cemented over and decorated with broken tiles from the Camarín de la Virgen. In 2011, the Pozo de la Virgen was reopened after 92 years of being hidden from the public.

Convent and patio 

Adjoining the Santa Ana church is the convent, which was also built on the same period as the church under the direction of Fr. Vicente Inglés. The ground floor is a stone and clay tile cloister surrounding the grassy patio. Above the cloister is a wooden corridor with capiz and glass windows and high doors leading to the priest's quarters, the choir loft and a room previously used as a library. In 1966, archaeological excavations have been conducted by the National Museum of the Philippines on the patio and the churchyard, uncovering 71 human burials dating around late 11th to 14th centuries from the associated Chinese ceramics recovered with the graves. The bulk of data gathered regarding the pre-Hispanic culture of Santa Ana (the ancient Kingdom of Namayan) led to the construction of a site museum in the patio, which was later declared as a National Cultural Treasure in August 1973 by the virtue of Presidential Decree No. 260.

Historical and cultural declarations 

The Santa Ana Church has been designated by the National Historical Commission of the Philippines (then Philippine Historical Research and Markers Committee) as a Historic Building in 1936 with a historical marker for being the first Franciscan mission established outside Manila. The Santa Ana Site Museum located in the convent patio and the Camarín de la Virgen was declared as a National Cultural Treasure in August 1973.

References

External links 

Roman Catholic churches in Manila
Cultural Properties of the Philippines in Metro Manila
Marked Historical Structures of the Philippines
Spanish Colonial architecture in the Philippines
Baroque architecture in the Philippines
Roman Catholic churches completed in 1725
National Historical Landmarks of the Philippines
National Cultural Treasures of the Philippines
Buildings and structures in Santa Ana, Manila
1725 establishments in the Philippines
18th-century Roman Catholic church buildings in the Philippines
Roman Catholic national shrines in the Philippines
Churches in the Roman Catholic Archdiocese of Manila